Alyaksandr Uladzimiravich Martynovich (born 26 August 1987) is a Belarusian professional footballer who plays as a centre-back for Russian club Rubin Kazan. In June 2011, he acquired Russian citizenship as well and is not considered a foreign player in Russian football competitions.

Club career
On 15 July 2010, Martynovich signed a 2.5-year contract with Russian First Division side FC Krasnodar, extending his contract for the first time in December 2012 for another 2.5-years, before extending it again in December 2014 till the summer of 2018. He left Krasnodar as his contract expired in May 2022.

On 13 June 2022, Martynovich signed a two-year contract with Rubin Kazan.

International career
Martynovich was part of the Belarus U-21 squad that participated in the 2009 UEFA European Under-21 Football Championship and played as a starter in the 1–5 loss against Sweden U-21, during which he scored an unfortunate own goal.
He has been capped for Belarus national team since November 2009, receiving his first call-up during Bernd Stange's tenure as coach. On 17 November 2010, Martynovich scored his only two goals for the team in the 4–0 away win against Oman in a friendly match. In March 2015, he succeeded Timofei Kalachev as the captain of the national team.

Career statistics

Club

International

Statistics accurate as of match played 25 Juny 2019

International goals

References

External links
 
 

1987 births
Footballers from Minsk
Living people
Belarusian footballers
Belarus youth international footballers
Belarus under-21 international footballers
Belarus international footballers
Association football defenders
FC RUOR Minsk players
FC Dinamo Minsk players
FC Krasnodar players
FC Ural Yekaterinburg players
FC Rubin Kazan players
Belarusian Premier League players
Russian Premier League players
Russian First League players
Belarusian expatriate footballers
Expatriate footballers in Russia
Belarusian expatriate sportspeople in Russia